A srambia or niskarappalli is a kind of little mosque found in Kerala state in India. A srambia is distinguished by the smallness and antique value of the property.  Very often the architecture is also unique. Often, the srambias were built by a single family or hamlet.  Srambia YouTube

Unique features
 Very small size
 Wooden materials used for construction
 Found in a paddy field
 Access to a body of water, such as a pond

Historic importance
Many of the srambias are very old and preserved with great care and passion.

Modernization
Many of the srambias are threatened by the threat of modernization as people ignorant of their important are razing them and replacing them with concrete structures.

Notable srambias
 Utharam Palli, Ettammel, Madayi, Kannur District
 Pucholamad Cheroor Srambia, Vengara, Malappuram
 Puzhakkara Srambia, Chaliyam, Calicut.
Mundathot Thamarakkulam Srambia, Thalakkattoor, Ozhur, Malappuram

References

Mosques in Kerala